Publications Mathématiques de l'IHÉS is a peer-reviewed mathematical journal. It is published by Springer Science+Business Media  on behalf of the Institut des Hautes Études Scientifiques, with the help of the Centre National de la Recherche Scientifique. The journal was established in 1959 and was published at irregular intervals, from one to five volumes a year. It is now biannual. The editor-in-chief is Claire Voisin (Collège de France).

See also
Annals of Mathematics
Journal of the American Mathematical Society
Inventiones Mathematicae

External links

Back issues from 1959 to 2010

Mathematics journals
Publications established in 1959
Springer Science+Business Media academic journals
Biannual journals
English-language journals